TattsLotto is a weekly lottery game played on Saturday nights in Australia, known as Saturday Lotto in New South Wales, South Australia and Western Australia, and Gold Lotto in Queensland. It was the first European-format "lotto" style lottery in Australia.

History
The game is a product of Tatts Group and since 1 June 2016, has been promoted under the master brand The Lott.
The first TattsLotto draw was televised by Melbourne television station HSV7 on 22 June 1972, and was hosted by David Johnston and Lucy Kiraly.

It is drawn every Saturday night and draws were telecast on Channel Seven in Melbourne, Prime7 in Southern NSW & Victoria, and the Seven Network & Network 10 affiliated Southern Cross Television in Tasmania until the mid 2000s.  Draws are now broadcast every Saturday night at approximately 7:30pm (AEST) on 7two and affiliated regional stations.

The game 
Six winning numbers and two supplementary numbers are drawn from the one barrel of 45 numbers.  To play one game the player chooses six numbers between 1 and 45. Players can choose to play games in lots of 12 games, 18 games, 24 games, 36 games etc.  Players can choose their own numbers for each game, or allow the computer to randomly generate numbers, known as a Quick Pick entry.  Winnings are calculated in 6 divisions with division 1 (six correct numbers) paying between 1 and 20 million dollars, however, some New Years Megadraws can win up to 30 million dollars, if not more.

Odds: 1 Game - 6/45 balls

See also

Lotteries in Australia

References

Lottery games
Lotteries in Australia
1972 establishments in Australia